The Rennsteiggarten Oberhof (7 hectares) is a botanical garden specializing in mountain flora, located in Rennsteig at Am Pfanntalskopf 3, Oberhof, Thuringia, Germany. It is open daily in the warmer months; an admission fee is charged.

The garden was established in 1970 on the grounds of a former quarry at an elevation of 868 meters on the Pfanntalskopf. In 1972 the Cultural Federation and University of Jena agreed to scientific support, and plantings began with material from the Botanischer Garten Jena. In 1980 an indigenous plant bog was created, with a nature garden begun in 1985 for protected plants from the Thuringian mountains, and in 1993 a garden of Thuringian herbs.

Species 
The garden contains about 4,000 species from the mountains of Europe, Asia, North and South America, New Zealand, and the Arctic, with a special focus on protected species of Thuringia. 

Specimens of interest include: 
 
 Acinos alpinus
 Adonis vernalis
 Androsace carnea
 Androsace helvetica
 Aquilegia formosa
 Arctostaphylos alpina
 Calceolaria darwinii
 Callianthemum anemonoides
 Caltha howellii
 Campanula barbata
 Cornus canadensis
 Cypripedium calceolus
 Daphne arbuscula
 Daphne blagayana
 Dianthus glacialis
 Eryngium alpinum
 Fritillaria meleagris
 Gentiana asclepiadea
 Gentiana lutea
 Gentiana occidentalis
 Gentiana verna
 Globularia cordifolia
 Helichrysum bellidioides
 Incarvillea mairei
 Lilium bulbiferum
 Lilium carniolicum
 Lilium oxypetalum
 Meconopsis integrifolia
 Ramonda nathaliae
 Rhododendron camtschaticum
 Rhododendron ferrugineum
 Salix hylematica
 Soldanella alpina
 Teucrium montanum
 Thalictrum aquilegiifolium
 Thymus doerfleri
 Tulipa montana

See also 
 List of botanical gardens in Germany

References

External links

 
 Photographs
 GardenVisit article

Oberhof, Rennsteiggarten
Oberhof, Rennsteiggarten
Thuringian Forest
Oberhof, Germany